Georgiana Finch-Hatton (or Finch), Countess of Winchilsea (3 June 1791 – 13 February 1835), formerly Lady Georgiana Charlotte Graham, was the first wife of George Finch-Hatton, 10th Earl of Winchilsea.

Early life

She was born at Petersham, the daughter of James Graham, 3rd Duke of Montrose, and his wife, the former Lady Caroline Maria Montagu. Her siblings included Lucy Herbert, Countess of Powis, and James Graham, 4th Duke of Montrose.

Her paternal grandparents were William Graham, 2nd Duke of Montrose and the former Lady Lucy Manners (a daughter of John Manners, 2nd Duke of Rutland).

Personal life
She married the earl on 26 July 1814, at Lambeth Palace. They had two children:

George Finch-Hatton, 11th Earl of Winchilsea (1815–1887)
Lady Caroline Finch-Hatton (1817–1888), who married Christopher Turnor and had children

She died at Haverholme Priory in Lincolnshire, a house rebuilt by the earl in 1830 and thereafter used as a family home. She was buried at nearby Ewerby.

References

1835 deaths
English countesses
Daughters of British dukes
1791 births